Amethystium is an ambient/electronica/neoclassical music project created by Norwegian producer, composer and multi-instrumentalist Øystein Ramfjord. Under the Amethystium name, Ramfjord has released five full-length albums (Odonata, Aphelion, Evermind, Isabliss, and Transience), a collection of works (Emblem (Selected Pieces)), as well as two EPs, all on Neurodisc Records.

Discography

Albums:

Odonata, released 14 August 2001
Songs:
01. Opaque
02. Ilona
03. Enchantment
04. Dreamdance
05. Tinuviel
06. Avalon
07. Calantha
08. Odyssey
09. Fairyland
10. Paean
11. Arcane Voices
12. Ascension
13. Ethereal
14. Lhasa

Aphelion, released 28 January 2003
Songs:
01. Shadow to Light
02. Garden of Sakuntala
03. Exultation
04. Ad Astra
05. Gates of Morpheus
06. Autumn Interlude
07. Elvensong
08. Shibumi
09. Hymnody
10. Withdrawal
11. Berceuse

Evermind, released 5 October 2004
Songs:
01. Arcus
02. Into the Twilight
03. Shadowlands
04. Break of Dawn
05. Innocence
06. Satori
07. Barefoot
08. Reverie
09. Lost
10. Fable
11. Imaginatio

Emblem (Selected Pieces), released 10 October 2006
Songs:
01. Ethereal
02. Arcus
03. Exultation
04. Autumn Interlude
05. Shadowlands
06. Fable
07. Shadow to Light
08. Dreamdance
09. Odyssey
10. Ad Astra
11. Enchantment
12. Satori
13. Elvensong
14. Meadowland
15. Anthemoessa

Isabliss, released 17 June 2008
Songs:
01. A small adventure
02. La pluie
03. Treasure
04. Unbounded
05. Anthemoessa
06. Automne
07. Strangely beautiful
08. Frosty morning bliss
09. Silken twine
10. Dreamlike insomnia
11. Elegy

Aurorae EP, released 20 January 2012
Songs:
01. Nightfall (4:23)
02. Solace (4:40)
03. Faraway (5:36)
04. Outro (6:04)

Transience, released 28 March 2014
Songs:
01. Mono No Aware (Opening)
02. Mesmerized
03. Nightfall
04. Luminescence
05. Solace
06. Faraway
07. Saudade
08. Breathe Out
09. Fairyland
10. Transience
11. Epilogue

Odonata – 20th Anniversary Edition, released 6 October 2020
Songs:
01. Opaque
02. Ilona
03. Enchantment
04. Dreamdance
05. Tinuviel
06. Avalon
07. Calantha
08. Odyssey
09. Fairyland
10. Paean
11. Arcane Voices
12. Ascension
13. Ethereal
14. Lhasa

See also
List of ambient music artists

References

External links
Amethystium Official Site
Neurodisc Records Official Site

Norwegian electronic music groups
Norwegian ambient music groups
New-age music groups
Neoclassical dark wave musical groups
Musical groups established in 1999
1999 establishments in Norway
Musical groups from Trondheim